Athlitikos Omilos Ayia Napa (Athletic Club Ayia Napa) is a Cypriot football club from the town of Ayia Napa. The club was founded in 1990 after the merger of two clubs: APEAN (Athlitiki Podosfairiki Enosis Ayias Napas; "Athletic Football Union of Ayia Napa") and ENAN (Enosis Neon Ayias Napas; "Youth Union Ayia Napa").

History
The club started in the Third Division (199091). They were promoted to Second Division in season 200001 after finishing 2nd in Third division. The team once played against Omonia Nicosia in Cup tournament. It lost 4–0 in the first match but came 2–2 in the second match.

Promotion to First Division
The biggest achievement of AO Ayia Napa's history was in the 200506 season after the team finished 3rd in Cypriot Second Division and was promoted to the Cypriot First Division. Despite it being their maiden appearance in the First Division, Ayia Napa proved a formidable force for other First Division sides in the 200607 season. In their first match in the division, they achieved a surprise away draw against Anorthosis Famagusta, which were followed by two more draws, including one against First Division Heavyweights Omonia Nicosia. In their first 12 matches overall they achieved several draws, including another home draw against APOEL. However, they had to wait until the 13th matchday for their first victory, when the team beat Aris Limassol 4–1. By the midway point of the season, the team had lost just 5 times. On January 14, 2007, in the reverse fixture of their earlier draw, Ayia Napa beat Omonia Nicosia 2–1, arguably the most impressive result in the clubs' history. After that victory there were a few more successful results and the club looked like they may avoid relegation. However, the team lost their last seven First Division matches of the season and ended up relegated.

Cup qualification to the Quarter-finals
Another big achievement of Ayia Napa FC is the qualification to the cup's quarter-finals group stage in the 200708 season while the team was in the Cypriot Second Division. That season was the only team from Cypriot Second Division that qualified to quarter-finals. The club finished third in the group stages with wins against APOEL and Aris Limassol.

Stadium
The team's stadium is Municipal Stadium of Ayia Napa, which is a multi-use stadium in Ayia Napa. It is currently used mostly for football matches and holds 2,000 people. However the stadium was not suitable for first division matches, so for the season 200607, when Ayia Napa plays in First Division, the team is using for home the Tasos Markou Stadium in Paralimni.

The UEFA European Under-19 Football Championship was hosted in Cyprus in 1998 and the UEFA European Under-16 Football Championship in 1992 and the Ayia Napa Stadium was used for two matches of Republic of Ireland in each competition; on June 19, 1998, their 5–2 victory against Croatia and four days later, their 3–0 Cyprus U-19 national team and qualified to the final where they went on to win the trophy. In 1992, the Irish were beaten by the Netherlands U-16 0–2 and tied by Spain 1–1.

Players

Managers
 Nikos Kolompourdas (Jan 16, 2013 – Feb 25, 2013)
 Costas Loizou (Feb 26, 2013 – April 5, 2013)
 Marios Neophytou (April 5, 2013 – Oct 21, 2013)
 Zouvanis Zouvani (Oct 24, 2013 – Jan 13, 2014)
 Dušan Mitošević (Jan 14, 2014 – Apr 17, 2014)
 Nikos Andronikou (June 6, 2014 – Sept 30, 2014)
 Giorgos Kosma (Oct 23, 2014 – Jan 28, 2016)
 Antonis Mertakkas (Jan 28, 2016 – Feb 14, 2016)

Honours
Cypriot Second Division (2):
2011–12, 2013–14

References

External links
Soccerway profile

 
Football clubs in Cyprus
Association football clubs established in 1990
1990 establishments in Cyprus